George Alt (January 9, 1886 – March 12, 1993) was an American politician. He served as a Republican member of the South Dakota House of Representatives.

Life and career 
Alt was born in Minnesota.

In 1935, Alt was elected to the South Dakota House of Representatives, representing Meade County, South Dakota, serving until 1938.

Alt died in March 1993 at the Rapid City Care Center, at the age of 107.

References 

1886 births
1993 deaths
People from Minnesota
Republican Party members of the South Dakota House of Representatives
20th-century American politicians
Men centenarians
American centenarians